The 1879 Limerick City by-election was fought on 23 May 1879.  The byelection was fought due to the death of the incumbent Home Rule MP, Isaac Butt.  It was won by the Home Rule candidate Daniel Fitzgerald Gabbett.

References

Politics of Limerick (city)
By-elections to the Parliament of the United Kingdom in County Limerick constituencies
1879 elections in the United Kingdom
Unopposed by-elections to the Parliament of the United Kingdom (need citation)
1879 elections in Ireland